Gottlob is a commune in Timiș County, Romania. It is composed of two villages, Gottlob (commune seat) and Vizejdia. These were part of the commune of Lovrin until 2004, when they were split off.

Etymology 
The commune's name is of German origin, with the meaning of "Praise to the Lord".

History 
Today's Gottlob was founded in 1773, at the same time as the neighboring village of Tomnatic, on a territory that was inhabited in the more distant past. Between 1770 and 1773, the administration, under the guidance of Chamber Councilor Hildebrand (according to other sources, Captain Tribaustter), would build 203 houses in Gottlob for German (Swabian) settlers. The Catholic parish was also founded in 1773. The vast majority of the settlers who founded Gottlob came from Luxembourg and Lorraine, but also from Alsace, Mainz, Trier, Franconia and a few other localities in Banat.

The Germans formed until 1940 the majority of Gottlob's population. There was also a sizable French community. After World War II, their numbers dropped dramatically, from about 90% to less than 10% in 1992 and a subsequent decline in the 1990s. In 1945, 168 Germans were deported to Russia. Another 310 people were deported to Bărăgan between 1951–1956.

Demographics 

Gottlob had a population of 2,041 inhabitants at the 2011 census, down 11% from the 2002 census. Most inhabitants are Romanians (86.13%), larger minorities being represented by Roma (4.07%), Germans (3.97%) and Hungarians (1.37%). For 2.89% of the population, ethnicity is unknown. By religion, most inhabitants are Orthodox (71.19%), but there are also minorities of Roman Catholics (12.3%), Pentecostals (8.57%) and Baptists (3.43%). For 2.89% of the population, religious affiliation is unknown.

Economy 
The main occupation of Gottlob's residents is agriculture. Gottlob is noted for its watermelon crops. Cabbage, peppers, potatoes, tomatoes, cauliflower and onions are also grown here. The largest blueberry plantation in western Romania was established in 2014 in Vizejdia.

References 

Communes in Timiș County
Localities in Romanian Banat
Former Danube Swabian communities in Romania